Sólo un Momento (Only a Moment) is the fourth album by Argentine rock and pop singer-songwriter Vicentico. It was released on September 29, 2010.

Reception 

The AllMusic review by Mariano Prunes awarded the album 3.5 stars, stating: "Vicentico's fourth solo album Sólo un Momento marks a stylistic departure from the Latin path in which he seemed so firmly entrenched by now, either as a solo artist or as the singer of Los Fabulosos Cadillacs... This is the first Vicentico production that does not feature horns and percussion, and the effect is initially quite strange. Above all, Solo un Momento comes off as a very somber album... Furthermore, the main problem with going back to a stripped-to-basics pop song format is that in order to stand out you need either a brilliant melody, lyric, or vocal performance, and while Vicentico has become quite accomplished at all of the above, he is not quite one of the true greats. Precisely for this reason, the value of Solo un Momento lies in its impressive artistic coherence more than in its individual moments".

Track listing 

All tracks by Vicentico except where noted.
iTunes
iMac

Songs 

 "Ya No Te Quiero" (I Don't Love You Anymore) – 3:19
 "Sólo Un Momento" (Only a Moment) (Vicentico, Cachorro Lopez) – 3:57
 "Viento" (Wind) – 3:06
 "La Carta" (The Letter) (Capello, Lopez) – 4:04
 "Cobarde" (Coward) – 3:10
 "El Rey del Rock & Roll" (The King of Rock & Roll) – 2:48
 "Morir a Tu Lado" (Dying at Your Side) (Capello, Lopez) – 4:02
 "Escondido" (Hidden) (Capello, Lopez) – 3:24
 "Sabor a Nada" (Taste of Nothing) (Ramón Ortega, Dino Ramos) – 3:54
 "El Pacto" (The Pact) – 4:13
 "Luca" – 3:27
 "El Otro" (The Other) – 3:15
 "Paisaje" (Bonus Track) – 3:42

Personnel 
 Dany Avila – drums
 Cachorro López – synthesizer
 Vicentico – drums, E-Bow, synthesizer, sitar
 Rafa Vila – A&R

References

External links 
 www.vicentico.com
 Sólo un Momento at MusicBrainz
 [ Sólo un Momento] at AllMusic

Vicentico albums
2010 albums